A vacated judgment (also known as vacatur relief) makes a previous legal judgment legally void. A vacated judgment is usually the result of the judgment of an appellate court, which overturns, reverses, or sets aside the judgment of a lower court. An appellate court may also vacate its own decisions.

A trial court may have the power under certain circumstances, usually involving fraud or lack of jurisdiction over the parties to a case, to vacate its own judgments.

A vacated judgment may free the parties to civil litigation to re-litigate the issues subject to the vacated judgment.

Another means of having a vacated judgment would be if the defendant dies prior to all appeals being exhausted. Notable defendants having their convictions vacated under this include Kenneth Lay, the former Chairman and CEO of Enron who died before sentencing, and Aaron Hernandez, a former football player who killed himself in jail before his appeals were exhausted. In March 2019, the vacated conviction of Hernandez was itself overturned, and his murder conviction upheld. On June 30, 2021, the Pennsylvania Supreme Court vacated the sexual assault charges against Bill Cosby due to violations of his right to due process.

United States
"Relief from judgment" of a United States District Court is governed by Rule 60 of the Federal Rules of Civil Procedure. The United States Court of Appeals for the Seventh Circuit has noted that a vacated judgment "place[s] the parties in the position of no trial having taken place at all; thus a vacated judgment is of no further force or effect."

One form of a vacatur in the United States legal system was established by United States v. This approach is used when while a case is being held on appeal, whether at the Circuit Court or Supreme Court level, underlying factors make the case moot. The higher court will vacate the lower court's ruling, send the case back to the lower court, and have them render the case moot. Certain conditions must be met before the higher court can give a Munsingwear vacatur, generally allowing this vacatur to be used in three situations: in the matter of "happenstance" (such as the death of a litigant), through a settlement of the parties, or a unilateral action by the prevailing party in the lower court.

See also

References

Judgment (law)
Civil procedure